is a passenger railway station in located in the city of Wakayama, Wakayama Prefecture, Japan, operated by West Japan Railway Company (JR West).

Lines

Station layout
The station consists of two opposed side platforms connected to the station building by a footbridge. The station is staffed.

Platforms

History
Musota Station opened on June 16, 1930. With the privatization of the Japan National Railways (JNR) on April 1, 1987, the station came under the aegis of the West Japan Railway Company.

Station numbering was introduced in March 2018 with Musota being assigned station number JR-R52.

Passenger statistics
In fiscal 2019, the station was used by an average of 3446 passengers daily (boarding passengers only).

Surrounding Area
 Honeeji Temple (commonly known as "Naokawa Kannon")
 Kaichi Junior and Senior High School
 Wakayama Municipal Wakayama High School
 Kinki University Wakayama High School / Junior High School

See also
List of railway stations in Japan

References

External links

 Musota Station Official Site

Railway stations in Wakayama Prefecture
Railway stations in Japan opened in 1930
Wakayama (city)